Bradley Knowles

Background
Knowles was born in Castleford, West Yorkshire, England.

Career
In 2019 he helped the Sheffield Eagles to win the inaugural 1895 Cup as they defeated Widnes Vikings 36–18 in the final.

In October 2021 Knowles signed for Halifax Panthers for the 2022 season.

References

External links
Featherstone Rovers profile

1993 births
Living people
Doncaster R.L.F.C. players
English rugby league players
Featherstone Rovers players
Halifax R.L.F.C. players
Rugby league players from Castleford
Rugby league second-rows
Rugby league wingers
Sheffield Eagles players